The Streamliners were a fleet of three streamlined electric multiple units built by the St. Louis Car Company for the Illinois Terminal Railroad in 1948–1949. They operated primarily between St. Louis, Missouri and Peoria, Illinois in the late 1940s and early to mid-1950s. They were the last interurban cars manufactured in the United States.

Design 
The St. Louis Car Company constructed all three sets. Each equipment set comprised three cars. The cars were constructed of fluted aluminum and were painted in a royal blue paint schene. 

These traction motors were supplied with traction current via overhead wires, reaching the unit through a trolley pole.

The twin axle bogies for the sets were manufacturer by General Steel Casting's.

Service 
The streamliners represented a last attempt by the Illinois Terminal to regain lost passenger traffic and were the first new passenger cars the railroad had ordered since 1918. The Illinois Terminal began teasing the new streamliners in 1947, but did not announce the order until May 1948. Its original plan was to place all three in service between St. Louis and Peoria. The first new train in service was the City of Decatur, which began operating between St. Louis, Missouri and Decatur, Illinois (not Peoria) on November 7, 1948. It was the first through service offered by the Illinois Terminal between those two cities.

By March 1950 all three sets were in operation. The other two, the Fort Crevecoeur and Mound City, were on the St. Louis–Peoria route as originally planned. All three trains offered parlor and "À la carte" dining service. The two streamliners made the trip in 4 hours 40 minutes, forty minutes faster than conventional interurbans on the route. Poor patronage led the Illinois Terminal to withdraw the City of Decatur in August 1950; the equipment was reassigned to the Peoria run. The new service was named Sangamon, which was the railroad's original choice in 1947.

All three sets were withdrawn by 1956 when passenger service on the Illinois Terminal ended.

See also 
 Electroliner

Notes

References

Further reading

External links 
 
 Illinois Traction Terminal Collection, McLean County Museum of History

Electric multiple units of the United States
St. Louis multiple units
North American streamliner trains
Vehicles introduced in 1948